Lucas Agustín Ocampo Galván (born 23 November 1997) is a Uruguayan footballer who plays as a midfielder for Antofagasta in the Chilean Primera División. .. Es representado por el Agente uruguayo <Gerardo Arias>.

Career
A graduate of the club's youth academy, Ocampo made his league debut for Liverpool Montevideo on 21 July 2018, coming on as a 79th-minute substitute for Federico Martínez in a 1-1 draw with Cerro. He scored his first goal for the club the following season, netting in the 40th minute of a 3-1 victory over Montevideo Wanderers.

In May 2021, Ocampo joined Chilean club Antofagasta after being released from Liverpool.

Career statistics

Club

References

External links
Agustín Ocampo at Eurosport

1997 births
Living people
Uruguayan footballers
Uruguayan expatriate footballers
Liverpool F.C. (Montevideo) players
Uruguayan Primera División players
C.D. Antofagasta footballers
Chilean Primera División players
Expatriate footballers in Chile
Association football midfielders
People from Paso de los Toros